Truog is a surname. Notable people with this surname include:
Chas Truog, a penciller who worked on the comic book Animal Man
Emil Truog, American soil scientist
Robert Truog, American bioethicist

See also
George Truog House, a historic house in Allegheny County, Maryland